Ohio Players is an American funk band, most popular in the 1970s. They are best known for their songs "Fire" and "Love Rollercoaster", and for their erotic album covers that featured nude or nearly nude women. Many of the women were models featured in Playboy.

The singles "Funky Worm", "Skin Tight", "Fire", and "Love Rollercoaster", and their albums Skin Tight, Fire, and Honey, were awarded Gold certification.

On August 17, 2013, Ohio Players were inducted into the inaugural class of the Rhythm and Blues Music Hall of Fame that took place at Cleveland State University in Cleveland, Ohio.

History
The band formed in Dayton, Ohio, United States, in 1959 as the Ohio Untouchables and initially included members Robert Ward (vocals/guitar), Marshall "Rock" Jones (bass), Clarence "Satch" Satchell (saxophone/guitar), Cornelius Johnson (drums), and Ralph "Pee Wee" Middlebrooks (trumpet/trombone). They were best known at the time as a backing group for The Falcons.

Ward had proved to be an unreliable leader, who would sometimes walk off the stage during gigs, forcing the group to stop playing. Eventually, the group vowed to keep playing even after he left. Ward and Jones got into a fistfight in 1964, after which the group broke up.

Ward found new backups, and the group's core members returned to Dayton. They replaced Ward with 21-year-old Leroy "Sugarfoot" Bonner (guitar), who would become the group's frontman, and added Greg Webster (drums). To accommodate Bonner's musical style preferences for the group ("R&B with a little flair to it") and to avoid competing with Ward, the group changed their format. By 1965, the group had renamed themselves the Ohio Players, reflecting its members' self-perceptions as musicians and as ladies' men.

The group added two more singers, Bobby Lee Fears and Dutch Robinson, and became the house band for the New York-based Compass Records. In 1967, they added vocalist Helena Ferguson Kilpatrick.

The group disbanded again in 1970. After again re-forming with a line-up including Bonner, Satchell, Middlebrooks, Jones, Webster, trumpeter Bruce Napier, vocalist Charles Dale Allen, trombonist Marvin Pierce, and keyboardist Walter "Junie" Morrison, the Players had a minor hit on the Detroit-based Westbound label with "Pain" (1971), which reached the top 40 of the Billboard R&B chart. James Johnson joined the group at this time as vocalist and saxophonist. Dale Allen shared co-lead vocals on some of the early Westbound material, although he was not credited on their albums Pain and Pleasure. It was at Westbound Records where the group met George Clinton, who admired their music. The two albums' avant-garde covers featured a spiked-black leather-bikini clad, bald model Pat "Running Bear" Evans, who would later grace additional Ohio Players albums, including Climax, Ecstasy, and Rattlesnake.

The band's first big hit single was "Funky Worm", which reached No. 1 on the Billboard R&B chart and peaked at No. 15 on the Hot 100 in May 1973. It sold over one million copies and was awarded a gold disc by the R.I.A.A. The band signed with Mercury Records in 1974. By then, their line-up had changed again, with keyboardist Billy Beck instead of Morrison and Jimmy "Diamond" Williams on drums instead of Webster. On later album releases, they added second guitarist/vocalist Clarence "Chet" Willis and conguero Robert "Kuumba" Jones. Meanwhile, keyboardist Walter "Junie" Morrison recorded three albums on his own before joining Funkadelic as the force behind their hit One Nation Under a Groove. An internet story in advance of a June, 2017 concert indicated that Billy Beck, Jimmy "Diamond" Williams, Clarence "Chet" Willis, and Robert "Rumba" Jones are still performing.

The band had seven top 40 hits between 1973 and 1976. These included "Fire" (No. 1 on both the R&B and pop chart for two weeks and one week respectively in February 1975 and another million seller) and "Love Rollercoaster" (No. 1 on both the R&B and pop charts for one week in January 1976; another gold disc recipient). The group also took on saxophonist James Johnson. The group's last big hit was "Who'd She Coo?" a No. 1 R&B hit in August 1976. It was their only success in the United Kingdom, where it peaked at No. 43 on the UK Singles Chart in July 1976. Their title track "Ecstasy" from the 1973 album Ecstasy was sampled by Jay-Z on "Brooklyn's Finest", featuring The Notorious B.I.G. from the 1996 album Reasonable Doubt.

In 1979, three members of the group went on to form Shadow, which released three albums. A reconfigured Ohio Players recorded across the 1980s, enjoying a minor hit single with "Sweat" (1988). They also released three albums in that decade, Tenderness, Ouch! and Graduation. Another collection, Orgasm, followed in 1993.

In August 2013, the Ohio Players were inducted into the Rhythm and Blues Hall of Fame at the Waetjen Auditorium of Cleveland State University as part of the inaugural class.

Personnel
Classic lineup
 Marshall "Rock" Jones – bass guitar (1959–1984)
 James "Diamond" Williams – drums, chimes, percussion, lead & backing vocals, timbales, congas (1974–1980; unknown–present)
 William "Billy" Beck – piano, grand piano, organ, Hammond B-3 organ, Rhodes piano, Wurlitzer electric piano, RMI Electra piano, clavinet, ARP Odyssey, ARP string ensemble, percussion, lead & background vocals (1974–1980; unknown–present)
 Leroy "Sugarfoot" Bonner – guitar, percussion, lead & background vocals (1964–1997)
 Ralph "Pee Wee" Middlebrooks – trumpet, trombone & background vocals (1959–1984)
 Clarence "Satch" Satchell – baritone saxophone, tenor saxophone, soprano saxophone, alto saxophone, flute, percussion, lead & background vocals (1959–1980)
 Marvin "Merv" Pierce – trumpet, flugelhorn, valve trombone & background vocals (1972–1982)

Other members
 Robert Ward – guitar (1959–1964)
 Cornelius Johnson – drums (1959–1964)
 Gregory "Greg" Webster – drums (1964–1974)
 Bobby Lee Fears – vocals (1964–1970)
 Dutch Robinson – vocals (1964–1970)
 Helena Ferguson Kilpatrick – vocals (1967–unknown)
 Charles Dale Allen – vocals (1970?–unknown)
 Bruce Napier – trumpet (1972–1974)
 Walter "Junie" Morrison – keyboards (1970–1974)
 James Johnson – vocals, saxophone (1971?–unknown)
 Clarence "Chet" Willis – guitars (1977–1980; unknown–present)
 Robert "Kuumba" Jones – congas (1977–present)
 Wes Boatman – keyboards (1980–1981)
 Jimmy Sampson – drums (1981–1982)

Timeline

Deaths
 Clarence Satchell (April 15, 1940 – December 30, 1995) died after suffering a brain aneurysm at age 55. 
 Ralph Middlebrooks (August 20, 1939 – November 15, 1997) died of cancer. 
 Vincent Thomas ("Venny Wu") (January 26, 1958 – February 16, 2008) died of cancer in his hometown of Lubbock, Texas. 
 Robert Ward (October 15, 1938 – December 25, 2008) died at home. 
 Cornelius Johnson (July 12, 1937 – February 1, 2009). 
 Leroy "Sugarfoot" Bonner (March 14, 1943 – January 26, 2013) died of cancer at age 69. 
 Marshall "Rock" Jones (January 1, 1941 – May 27, 2016) died of cancer in Houston, Texas, at age 75. He was the last surviving member from the Ohio Untouchables line-up. 
 Walter "Junie" Morrison (1954 – January 21, 2017) died at age 62.
 Shaun Dedrick died on May 2, 2018, at age 55, following an illness, in Dayton, Ohio.
 Gregory "Greg" Webster (January 4, 1938 – January 14, 2022) died at age 84. He was the last surviving member of the original Ohio Players line-up.

Discography

Studio albums

Live albums
Ol' School (1996, Essential Music)

Compilation albums

Singles

Notes
 "Fire" also peaked at No. 10 on Billboard's Disco Action chart.

See also
 List of artists who reached number one in the United States
 Unsung

References

External links
 Ohio Players at Wenig-LaMonica Associates
 
 

Musical groups established in 1959
Musical groups disestablished in 2002
African-American musical groups
American dance music groups
Mercury Records artists
Funk musical groups from Dayton, Ohio
American rhythm and blues musical groups
Tangerine Records artists
1959 establishments in Ohio